Between 2015 and 2016, unusually high infant mortality rates occurred at the neonatal intensive care unit of the Countess of Chester Hospital in Chester, England. A series of investigations was initiated to ascertain the reasons for the sharp rise in mortalities.

After a lengthy set of investigations, Lucy Letby, a nurse working at the hospital at the time, was arrested in 2018 on suspicion of eight counts of suspected murder and six counts of attempted murder. She was released on bail pending further enquiries. Letby was arrested for a second time in 2019 with eight alleged murders and nine alleged attempted murders; again she was bailed pending further enquiries. Letby's final arrest came in November 2020 following which she was charged with 8 counts of murder and 10 counts of attempted murder.

Letby's trial began in October 2022, and is due to conclude after six months.

Initial investigation
In July 2016, the neonatal unit at the Countess of Chester Hospital stopped accepting premature infants born before 32 weeks, partially due to an unexplained high mortality rate in 2015 and 2016, instead diverting them to other hospitals in the North West of England, such as Alder Hey. The MBRRACE-UK (Mothers and Babies: Reducing Risk through Audits and Confidential Enquires across the UK) report had found a neonatal death rate at least 10% higher than expected in the period June 2015-June 2016.

A series of investigations was initiated to ascertain the reasons for the sharp rise in mortalities, with an independent review being carried out by the Royal College of Paediatrics and Child Health and the Royal College of Nursing. Despite this report finding some staffing levels "inadequate", the Foundation Trust were unable to identify the fundamental cause(s) of the high mortality rate, with the independent report similarly finding "no single cause or factor identified to explain the increase.. seen in [the] mortality numbers". 

In May 2017, the Foundation Trust brought in Cheshire Police to assist with the ongoing review, stating this was to "seek assurances that enable us to rule out unnatural causes of death."

Arrest and trial of Lucy Letby

Lucy Letby (born 4 January 1990) is a registered nurse from Chester, originally from Hereford, who had originally worked in the neonatal unit at Countess of Chester Hospital from 2011 to 2016, later being moved to clerical duties from 2016 to 2018. She had worked at the hospital since 2011 after graduating with a nursing degree from the University of Chester earlier that year. She had also worked on the unit as a student nurse during her three years of training. Letby was working in the neonatal unit at the time the high infant mortality rates occurred there from 2015 to 2016, having been appointed as the designated nurse for several of the babies.

On 6 February 2012, Letby appeared in a photo holding a baby as part of a story on a resident who had donated money to the hospital's appeal. On 28 March 2013, Letby was the subject of a short interview about her job, in which she stated that her role at the hospital involves "caring for a wide range of babies requiring various levels of support" and that she enjoys "seeing them progress and supporting their families." She also revealed that she had recently completed a placement at Liverpool Women’s Hospital. A photo of Letby holding a babygrow was featured alongside the interview in an article published in The Standard newspaper.

In 2013, Letby was part of a campaign to raise 3 million pounds in three years to create a new neonatal unit for the hospital, which she hoped would "provide a greater degree of privacy and space for parents and siblings." Letby was still working at the hospital at the time of her arrest in July 2018, though she had been moved from the neonatal ward in June 2016 to clerical duties where she would not come into contact with children, after consultants from the hospital suspected the high infant mortality rates between 2015 and 2016 were "not medically explicable” and were "the result of the actions of Lucy Letby.”

Arrest and charges 
On 3 July 2018, Letby was arrested by police on suspicion of eight counts of suspected murder and six counts of attempted murder, following a year-long investigation into the high infant mortality rates at the Countess of Chester Hospital. Letby's home at Arran Avenue, Hereford was searched by police following her arrest. After the arrest of Letby, the investigation was subsequently widened to include Liverpool Women's Hospital, another location at which Letby had worked, though no evidence that patients at the hospital came to any harm was found during the investigation.

Letby was bailed on 6 July 2018 as the police continued their enquiries. She was rearrested on 10 June 2019 in connection with eight alleged murders and nine alleged attempted murders of babies, and again on 10 November 2020. On 11 November 2020, Letby was charged with eight counts of murder and ten counts of attempted murder. She was denied bail and remained in police custody.

Trial 

Letby's trial began at Manchester Crown Court on 10 October 2022, before Mr Justice Goss, and is due to conclude after six months. She pleaded not guilty to seven counts of murder, and fifteen counts of attempted murder relating to ten babies. The alleged victims could not be named in reports and were referred to as Child A to Child Q. The families of the alleged victims and Letby's parents attended the trial.

The prosecutor Nick Johnson KC said that Letby was a "constant malevolent presence" in the hospital's neonatal unit, and that Letby had searched for the parents of several babies on Facebook – two of which were the parents of an alleged victim – as well as sending one family a sympathy card. It was alleged by the prosecutor that Letby had injected air into the bloodstream of two of the alleged victims and had used insulin to murder others. A mother of one of the alleged victims said she had walked in on Letby trying to kill her baby, with Letby allegedly saying "Trust me, I'm a nurse" when interrupted. It was also revealed during the trial that Letby had to be told more than once not to go into a room where the parents of one of the babies she is accused of murdering were grieving.

Letby's defence lawyer, Benjamin Myers KC, alleged that Letby was "a dedicated nurse in a system which has failed", claimed that the prosecution case was "driven by the assumption that someone was doing deliberate harm combined with the coincidence on certain occasions of Miss Letby's presence", and alleged there had been a "massive failure of care in a busy hospital neonatal unit – far too great to blame on one person". It was alleged that "extraordinary bleeding" in a baby boy allegedly murdered by Letby could have been caused by a rigid wire or tube, and that one of the babies who survived had an "extremely high" dose of insulin. The use of insulin at the hospital was denied by Letby's colleagues.

The court was shown texts sent by Letby to her friends, one of which discussed the baby deaths, which Letby described as "sad and cruel" and "heartbreaking", later adding "It's not about me or anyone else, it's those poor parents who have to walk away without their baby. It's so unbelievably sad." Letby had also told a colleague that taking Child A to the mortuary was "the hardest thing she ever had to do". Ravi Jayaram, a paediatrician at the Countess of Chester Hospital, revealed during the trial that he and other clinicians had previously raised concerns over Letby, but were told by hospital bosses that they "really should not really be saying such things" and "not to make a fuss". Another doctor attending the trial said that Letby, in relation to one of the premature babies, told the doctor "he's not leaving here alive, is he?" an hour before the child died.

On the fourth day of the trial, the prosecution showed the court an alleged confession on a post-it note from Letby, which said "I am evil, I did this" and that she "killed them on purpose" because she "couldn't take care of them". The defence argued that the note was "the anguished outpouring of a young woman in fear and despair when she realises the enormity of what's being said about her, in the moment to herself", and said that Letby had written it when she was dealing with employment issues, including a grievance procedure with the NHS trust. Several other post-it notes from Letby were shown in court, two of which respectively said "Why/how has this happened – what process has led to this current situation? What allegations have been made and by who? Do they have written evidence to support their comments?" and "I haven't done anything wrong and they have no evidence so why have I had to hide away?", both of which were Letby expressing frustration at the fact that she was not being allowed back on the neonatal unit.

See also
Colin Norris – UK nurse convicted of murdering four patients with insulin in 2008

References

2015 in England
2016 in England
2022 in England
2020s trials
2010s in Cheshire
2020s in Cheshire
Trials in England
Crime in England
History of Chester
2022 scandals